Drillia cratista is a species of sea snail, a marine gastropod mollusk in the family Drilliidae.

Description

Distribution
This species occurs in the Caribbean Sea off Jamaica.

References

External links
 

cratista
Gastropods described in 1927